CIBC Tower is a  45-storey skyscraper in Montreal, Quebec. The International Style office tower was built by Peter Dickinson, with associate architects Ross, Fish, Duschenes and Barrett, and was the city's tallest building from 1962 to 1963. The building holds offices for the Canadian Imperial Bank of Commerce, the corporate law firm Stikeman Elliott, as well as numerous other businesses.

The building is located at 1155 René Lévesque Boulevard West next to Dorchester Square facing the imposing but dwarfed Sun Life Building. Part of the fire-damaged Windsor Hotel was demolished to make room for construction, with the remaining portion being converted to offices in the 1980s.

History
The project was initiated by the Canadian Bank of Commerce and announced in 1959. While the building was under construction, the Bank of Commerce merged with the Imperial Bank of Canada to form the Canadian Imperial Bank of Commerce, effective June 1, 1961. The Imperial Bank abandoned its concurrent plan for a new head office at 612 McGill Street; that building was instead occupied by Crédit foncier franco-canadien, and since 1988 by Quebecor.

Completed in 1962, a few months before Place Ville-Marie, the CIBC Tower was the tallest building in Canada and the entire Commonwealth of Nations when it was first built, until being surpassed later that year by Place Ville-Marie where a penthouse was added by the competing Royal Bank for that express purpose.

The Consulate of Israel was on the 26th floor of the building and as such, it was sometimes the site of demonstrations related to the Israeli–Palestinian conflict. The consulate has since relocated to Westmount Square in Westmount.

Architecture
The tower is exceptionally slender with only  of gross floor area per floor, because of a zoning regulation limiting the total building floor area to twelve times the property area. Its façade is more ornamental than that of the average International style tower, with horizontal strips of glass curtain wall alternating with spandrels of various types of stone, including green slate that was quarried in Wales. The building was fully renovated in 1991, and the highly visible CIBC logo at the top was redesigned in 2004 and again in 2013.

Inside, levels 15 and 29 are transfer floors; level 16 is a triple-height mechanical floor that is skipped in the floor numbering of the passenger elevators. Levels 42-44 are also mechanical floors; level 45 was originally an indoor observation deck but was closed in the 1970s. The top  of the tower are actually an open-air raised partition, built sometime after construction, that hides the rooftop elevator control rooms.

Until the end of 2018, French-language radio station CKOI-FM transmitted its 307,000 watt signal from atop the building. The antenna has since been removed.

Tenants
Canadian Imperial Bank of Commerce
Euler Hermes
Macquarie Group
Russell Investments
Stikeman Elliott LLP
Vilaron Corporation
Linkeo.com
MNP LLP
ACE Aviation Holdings
Parkland Fuel Corporation

See also
 List of tallest buildings in Montreal
 Old Royal Bank Building, Montreal
 Molson Bank Building, Montreal
 Bank of Montreal Head Office, Montreal
 Old Canadian Bank of Commerce Building, Montreal
 Commerce Court, Toronto
 Commerce Place I and Commerce Place II

References

External links

 Official website

Office buildings completed in 1962
Canadian Imperial Bank of Commerce
Skyscrapers in Montreal
Bank buildings in Canada
International style architecture in Canada
Downtown Montreal
Peter Dickinson (architect) buildings
1962 establishments in Quebec
Skyscraper office buildings in Canada